56th Regiment may refer to:

 56th (West Essex) Regiment of Foot, a unit of the British Army 
 56th (King's Own) Anti-Tank Regiment, Royal Artillery, a unit of the British Army 
 56th Punjabi Rifles (Frontier Force), a unit of the British Indian Army 
 56th Infantry Regiment (United States), a unit of United States Army during World War I and World War II
 56th Air Defense Artillery Regiment, a unit of the United States Army
 56th Field Artillery Regiment, RCA, a unit of the Canadian Army 

American Civil War
Union (Northern) Army
 56th Massachusetts Infantry Regiment
 56th New York Volunteer Infantry
 56th Illinois Volunteer Infantry Regiment
 56th Ohio Infantry
 56th Regiment Indiana Infantry
 56th United States Colored Infantry Regiment
 56th Pennsylvania Infantry

Confederate (Southern) Army
 56th North Carolina Infantry
 56th Virginia Infantry

See also
 56th Division (disambiguation)
 56th Group (disambiguation)
 56th Brigade (disambiguation)
 56th Squadron (disambiguation)